DeLorean may refer to:
 John DeLorean (1925–2005), American businessman who founded the DeLorean Motor Company
 DeLorean Motor Company, former automobile manufacturer, based in North America
 DMC DeLorean, the single automobile produced by the DeLorean Motor Company
 DeLorean time machine, the fictional time machine with a flux capacitor built into a DeLorean that is featured in the Back to the Future trilogy
 DeLorean Motor Company (Texas), service and parts supplier for DeLorean automobiles and EV manufacturer, not affiliated with former manufacturer
 The Delorean custom guitar made by Hugh Manson for Matt Bellamy of Muse
 Delorean (band), a Basque synthpop group
 Delorean (album), a 2004 album by Delorean
 DeLorean, a 2007 album by Stonefree
 "Delorean", a song written and performed by Rocket from the Crypt in 1999 on a split 7-inch record with the Hellacopters